Karin Ørnhøj Mortensen (born 26 September 1977) is a former Danish team handball player and two times Olympic champion. She received gold medals with the Danish national team at the 2000 Summer Olympics in Sydney and at the 2004 Summer Olympics in Athens.

She retired from the national team in September 2012.

References

External links
 
 
 

1977 births
Living people
Danish female handball players
Olympic gold medalists for Denmark
Handball players at the 2000 Summer Olympics
Handball players at the 2004 Summer Olympics
Handball players at the 2012 Summer Olympics
Olympic medalists in handball
Olympic handball players of Denmark
Medalists at the 2004 Summer Olympics
Medalists at the 2000 Summer Olympics
People from Horsens
Sportspeople from the Central Denmark Region